Kill Dil is a 2014 Indian Hindi-language romantic action comedy film directed by Shaad Ali and produced by Aditya Chopra under the Yash Raj Films banner. The film stars Ranveer Singh, Ali Zafar and Parineeti Chopra in lead roles with Govinda portraying the antagonist. The film was released on 13 November 2014. The movie received mixed reviews with praise directed towards the music, humour and Govinda's performance but criticism aimed towards its screenplay and direction.

Plot
Tutu (Ali Zafar) and Dev Sharma (Ranveer Singh) are two orphans who were raised by a local gangster Bhaiyaji (Govinda) to be assassins. Their life takes a turn when they meet Disha (Parineeti Chopra) at a club and she and Dev fall in love with each other. Dev's indifference towards work starts irritating Bhaiyaji, but Tutu defends Dev. When Dev is unable to kill one of their targets, he decides to change his life. This enrages Bhaiyaji and he threatens to kill Dev. Tutu intervenes and suggests Dev lookout for a job but should accompany him every time Bhaiyaji calls them to give killing contracts.

Tutu gets Dev a fake MBA degree which helps Dev join an insurance company. Dev and Disha make plans to get married, while Disha is unaware of Dev's past. Bhaiyaji on learning the truth about Dev's job decides to play a trick to get him back. He sends one of his goons, Batuk, to kill Dev and informs Tutu. He also calls up Disha and tells her about Dev and Tutu's real identity. Just when Batuk is about to kill Dev, Tutu shoots him down in front of Disha. Disha is shocked with the reality and breaks up with Dev. This results in Dev again becoming an assassin.

Bhaiyaji gives them a fresh contract to kill his arch-enemy Baban Pehlwan. Dev and Tutu record a video telling the tale of how they became gangsters and send it to Disha. During a shootout, Dev is again unable to fire the gun and gets shot. Tutu takes him to the hospital, where after an operation, Dev finds Disha waiting for him and they both reconcile. Bhaiyaji gets killed by Baban Pehlwan. Dev and Disha get married while Tutu has a job interview in the same insurance company with a fake MBA degree.

Cast
 Govinda as Bhaiyaji, a gangster
 Ali Zafar as Tutu
 Ranveer Singh as Dev Sharma, Disha's husband
 Parineeti Chopra as Disha Sharma, Dev's wife
 Alok Nath as Jeewan Sambandh Insurance Owner
 Jass Bhatia as Chimsy
 Maanvi Gagroo as Jenny
 Sukhwinder Singh as Dulha in "Happy Budday" song

Production
Parineeti Chopra signed to the film, with Govinda as the antagonist.

Early on in February 2014, many shots of the movie were taken in Greater Noida's Gautam Buddha University and Galgotias Campus One and at The Grand Venice Mall. Ali, Ranveer Singh and Govinda share the dance floor in the movie. Through March the film was shot at various locations in Delhi. Later in April 2014, a schedule of the film with leads Ali Zafar, Ranveer Singh and Parineeti Chopra was shot at Lavasa And (Kharghar) Mumbai in Maharashtra.

It was the first Indian film in 4DX.

Critical reception
Sukanya Verma of Rediff said "It has random songs, birdbrained logic and a romance that's about as exciting as toothpaste." Saibal Chaterjee from NDTV gave the film 2 stars and said "Watch Kill Dil if you have plenty of time to kill. It is unlikely to deliver much joy to your dil, though." Koimoi gave 2 stars and said the film has bad writing and poor direction. DNA said that it fails to connect with audiences and gave 2 stars, while praising Govinda's performance.

Box office reception
The film grossed  in India on its opening weekend, recouping most of its budget. In Pakistan, Kill Dil had the third-highest opening weekend gross of 2014 behind Kick and Happy New Year. In its first week it collected a total of  according to Box Office India.

Soundtrack

The music of Kill Dil was composed by Shankar–Ehsaan–Loy (Shankar Mahadevan, Ehsaan Noorani and Loy Mendonsa), with lyrics by Gulzar. The soundtrack comprises 8 songs. The soundtrack was released on 9 October 2014.

The title song of the film sung by Sonu Nigam and Shankar Mahadevan was released on 25 September 2014.

Another single, "Sweeta", sung by Adnan Sami, was released on 2 October 2014.

See also
List of 4DX motion-enhanced films

References

External links
 

Indian 3D films
Indian romantic comedy films
Indian action comedy films
2010s Hindi-language films
Yash Raj Films films
2014 films
2014 3D films
Films shot in Maharashtra
Indian gangster films
2014 action comedy films
2014 romantic comedy films
Indian romantic action films
Films directed by Shaad Ali
2010s romantic action films
4DX films